Milroy is a census-designated place in Anderson Township, in the southern part of Rush County, in the U.S. state of Indiana.

History
Milroy was laid out and platted in 1830. The Milroy post office has been in operation since 1832.

Education
The community contains Milroy Elementary School, a public school in the county school district.

Geography

Demographics

References

External links
 Town of Milroy Economic Development Corporation website

Unincorporated communities in Rush County, Indiana
Unincorporated communities in Indiana